Gougeard is a French surname. Notable people with the surname include:

 Alexis Gougeard (born 1993), French cyclist
 Auguste Gougeard (1827–1886), French Navy officer and politician

French-language surnames